Lutzville is a settlement in West Coast District Municipality in the Western Cape province of South Africa. It resides under the Matzikama Local Municipality.

Village 22 km north-west of Vredendal and 45 km west of Vanrhynsdorp. Established in August 1923 as Vlermuisklip, but later (~1950) renamed after its founder, Johan J Lutz.

Lutzville is located next to the Olifants River and at high tide it is possible to navigate in a flat-bottomed boat to Papendorp, about 30 km downstream near the river's mouth.

References

Populated places in the Matzikama Local Municipality